KVCX is a Christian radio station licensed to Gregory, South Dakota, broadcasting on 101.5 MHz FM, and serving southern South Dakota and northern Nebraska. The station is owned by VCY America, Inc.

Programming
KVCX's programming includes Christian Talk and Teaching programming including; Crosstalk, Worldview Weekend with Brannon Howse, Grace to You with John MacArthur, In Touch with Dr. Charles Stanley, Love Worth Finding with Adrian Rogers, Revive Our Hearts with Nancy Leigh DeMoss, The Alternative with Tony Evans, Liberty Council's Faith and Freedom Report, Thru the Bible with J. Vernon McGee, Joni and Friends, Unshackled!, and Moody Radio's Stories of Great Christians.

KVCX also airs a variety of vocal and instrumental traditional Christian Music, as well as children's programming such as Ranger Bill.

History
The station began broadcasting on May 8, 1982, and held the call sign KKSD. KKSD aired country music and farm programming. In 1987, the station was sold to Wisconsin Voice of Christian Youth for $255,000. The station adopted its current Christian format, and its call sign was changed to KVCX.

See also
 VCY America
 Vic Eliason
 List of VCY America Radio Stations

References

External links
 VCY America official website
 

VCX
Radio stations established in 1982
1982 establishments in South Dakota
VCY America stations